My Boy is a Canadian short teen drama film, directed by Sarah Pellerin and released in 2018. The film stars Henri Richer-Picard as Louis, a shy, quiet teenager struggling with the rituals and codes of masculinity at his older brother's bachelor party.

The film premiered at the 2018 Toronto International Film Festival.

The film received a Prix Iris nomination for Best Short Film at the 21st Quebec Cinema Awards in 2019, and a Canadian Screen Award nomination for Best Live Action Short Drama at the 8th Canadian Screen Awards in 2020.

References

External links
 

2018 films
2018 drama films
2018 short films
2010s teen drama films
Canadian teen drama films
Films shot in Quebec
French-language Canadian films
Canadian drama short films
2010s Canadian films